Swami Keshwanand (12 March 1883 – 13 September 1972) was an Indian freedom fighter and social reformer.

Early life

Born in Jat family of village Magloona in Sikar district of present-day Rajasthan in 1883, Swamiji, whose actual name was Birama, was the son of Thakarsi, a penurious camel-driver, and his wife Saran. The family were Hindu and belonged to the Dhaka gotra and the Jat clan. When Birama was five, his family left Magluna for the nearby town of Ratangarh. Thakarsi, who used to escort prosperous Seths (Businessman) from Ratangarh to Delhi on his camel, died in 1890 when Birama was seven. This put paid to Birama's already slim chances of gaining an education; it is said that for a prolonged period, his mother had perforce to move from place to place in search of shelter and fodder for her animals. Mother and son finally settled at village Kelania in present-day Sri Ganganagar district in 1897. However, this was not the end of their misfortunes: Rajasthan was then headed for one of its periodic famines. By one account: "There was no vegetation left on the ground. There was no drop of water. All the animals died for want of fodder. People survived on grasses and the bark of "Khejri" trees. Even that also became scarce. There was nothing like governance. The ruling Samants were least bothered for the poor people....". It was in these circumstances that Birama's mother Saran died in 1899 at village Kelania.

Education

The famine of 1899 forced the 16-year-old Birama to leave the desert region and move to Punjab in search of livelihood. Circumstances had induced in him an ineffable spiritual quest. He approached Mahant Kushaldas of the Udasin sect, to whom he expressed the desire to learn Sanskrit, to be able to study the higher Hindu scriptures from primary sources. Noting that Birama belonged to the Jat caste, who were customarily precluded from studying the higher scriptures or even the liturgical Sanskrit language, Mahant Kushaldas advised him to become a sannyasi, or renunciate, which would render him eligible to learn Sanskrit. Accordingly, Birama became a sannyasi in 1904, was inducted into the Udasin sect, and commenced his education at the Sadhu Ashram Fazilka, a Hindu seminary located in Punjab. He learned the Hindi and Sanskrit languages and the Devanagari and Gurmukhi scripts at the Ashram. At the Kumbha Mela held at Prayag in 1905, Mahatma Hiranandji Avadhut conferred on Birama the new name "Swami Keshwanand".

Career
Swami Keshwanand lived a life of many facets—as freedom fighter, educator and social reformer.

Freedom fighter
The Jalianwalla Bagh Massacre of 1919, which caused a profound impact on the collective psyche of the Punjab, left Swami Keshawanand profoundly moved.He started going to the meetings of Arya Samaj and was influenced by its philosophy. He started attending the meetings of the Indian National Congress, joined the Indian Independence Movement Pandit Madan Mahan Malviya influenced him. He attended Delhi Adhiveshan of congress chaired by Madan Mahan Malviya in 1919. He participated in the non-cooperation movement, for which was imprisoned for two years (1921–1922) at Ferozepur. In 1930, he was given charge of Congress activities in Ferozepur district. He was again arrested the same year, but was soon released pursuant to the Gandhi-Irwin pact.

Educator
Swami Keshwanand, an orphan, illiterate, nomadic man who never received formal education, was the founder of more than 300 schools, 50 hostels and innumerable libraries, social service centres and museums. In 1911, within a few years of his initiation into the Udasin Dasnami sect as a sanyasi, swami Keshawanand started the "Vedant Pushp Vatika" library within the precincts of the Sadhu Ashram Fazilka. The following year, he started a Sanskrit school at the same place. In 1932, swami Keshwanand was made director of the Jat School, Sangaria, which was at the verge of closure for want of funds. He went from village to village to collect funds, and was successful in averting the closure of the school, which was renamed Gramothan Vidyapith, Sangaria in 1948. Within the precincts of this school, Swami Keshwanand developed a museum with a valuable collection of rare documents, paintings and antiques, thus initiating the idea of conservation in a profoundly backward area. The students of the school, aided by the local community, undertook a large-scale, successful project to green the precincts of the school, which is located in one of the most arid regions of India. Gramothan Vidyapith, Sangaria has become an inspiration for educators far and wide.

Propagation of Hindi
Swami Keshwanand felt that the knowledge of the Hindi language is a must to keep the country united and to educate the public about nationality. Swami's own mother-tongue was of course Bagri(Rajasthani) but he somehow felt that forcing people from other parts of India to learn that language would aid national unity. He started his programme of spreading Hindi by founding, in 1920, a Hindi forum, the 'Nagari Pracharini Sabha', at Abohar in the Ferozepur district of Punjab. This forum was later renamed "Sahitya Sadan, Abohar". In 1933, he started a press named "Deepak" at Abohar, which published material in Hindi language that was distributed either free or at a very nominal price. He organised the 30th All India Hindi Sahitya Sammelan at Sahitya Sadan, Abohar, in 1941. Swami Keshwanand was a longtime member of the Hindi Sahitya Sammelan, Allahabad. He either himself wrote, or arranged for the translation into Hindi, of around 100 books. At immense effort over the course of eleven years, he arranged for the publication of the Hindi edition of the book "History of Sikhs" in 1954. In 1942, he was honoured with the "Sahitya Vachaspati".

Social reformer
Swami Keshwanand's deep understanding of the rural society of the desert region can be gleaned from his book "Maru Bhumi Seva Karya". In this book, he has explained the peculiarities of the Desert region, identified the problems and suggested solutions. It was Swami Keshwanand's lifelong endeavour to eradicate social evils like untouchability, illiteracy, child marriage, indebtedness, poverty, backwardness, alcohol abuse, moral dissipation, etc.

Swami Keshwanand, born in a Jat Hindu family of Dhaka clan, and a renunciate belonging to the Udasi sect which was propagated by Srichandji, son of guru Nanakdevji, the founder of the Sikh faith, was a unique example of communal harmony. He organised celebrations in honour of Sikh, Bishnoi, Namdhari and Jain gurus. During the partition of India in 1947, he got wounded Muslims admitted to hospitals and arranged food and shelter for them.

Swami Keshwanand started a girls' school called (Gramothan Vidyapeath) in Sangriya in August 1917. Because of his efforts, many others in Sangriya have prioritised education.

Swami Keshwanand was presented the “Abhinandan Granth” by the then chief minister of Rajasthan on 9 March 1958. He was a member of the Rajya Sabha for two consecutive terms, 1952–58 and 1958–64. He died on 13 September 1972 in Delhi. The department of Posts, Government of India, issued a commemorative postage stamp in his honour on 15 August 1999. In 2009, Swami Keshwanand Rajasthan Agricultural University was named after him.

References

1883 births
1972 deaths
Rajasthani people
Indian independence activists from Rajasthan
Keshawanand
People from Sikar district
Indian social reformers
20th-century Indian educational theorists
Rajya Sabha members from Rajasthan